Ablaze My Sorrow is a melodic death metal band from Falkenberg, Sweden. The group formed in 1993, released three full-length albums for No Fashion Records through several lineup changes, and received significant exposure among metal press outlets before disbanding in August 2006. In January 2013 the band reunited.

History
The group first came together in 1993, featuring original members Martin Quist on vocals and guitar, Magnus Carlsson on guitar, Anders Brorsson on bass, and Fredrik Wenzel on drums. The group recorded a demo before drummer Alex Bengtsson replaced Wenzel and guitarist Roger Johansson joined the group, both playing on their 1996 debut for No Fashion Records entitled If Emotion Still Burns. After the release of the record, Quist and Johansson left the group, and were replaced by Fredrik Arnesson on vocals and Dennie Linden on guitar in time for their follow-up effort, 1997's The Plague. After The Plague, the group went on a temporary hiatus, and replaced Fredrik Arnesson with new vocalist Kristian Lönnsjö and electronic bagpipist Chris Kojali.  In 2001, they returned with their third album, Anger, Hate and Fury.<ref>[http://www.metal.de/cdreviews.php4?was=review&id=2806 Review of Anger, Hate and Fury]. Metal.de. Accessed November 17, 2007.</ref> The cover of the album featured artwork by Niklas Sundin, a renowned album cover artist. In 2004, the group played the Swedish 2000 Decibel festival. On August 16, 2006, the group announced it was breaking up. In January 2013 the band reunited.
Members
Current line-up
Anders Brorsson - bass (1993-2006, 2013-present)
Magnus Carlsson - guitars (1993-1997, 1998-2006, 2013-present)
Alex Bengtsson - drums (1994-2006, 2013-present)
Dennie Lindén - guitars (1996-2006, 2013-present)
Jonas Udd - vocals (2019-present)

Former members
Kristian Lönnsjö - vocals (1999-2006, 2009, 2013-2019)
Anders Lundin - guitar (1998–1999)
Fredrik Arnesson - vocals (1997–2000)
Roger Johansson - guitar (1995–1996)
Fredrik Wenzel - drums (1993–1995)
Martin Qvist - vocals, guitar (1993–1997)

Timeline

Discography

Studio albumsIf Emotions Still Burn (1996, No Fashion Records)The Plague (1998, No Fashion Records)Anger, Hate and Fury (2002, No Fashion Records)Black (2016, Apostasy Records)Among Ashes and Monoliths (2021, Black Lion Records)

EPsThe Suicide Note (2009, Pronode Records)The Loss of All Hope (2023, Black Lion Records)

Demo albumsFor Bereavement We Cried (1994)The Song of Dancing Sins (1994)Ablaze My Sorrow'' (1995)

References

Swedish death metal musical groups
Musical groups established in 1993
Musical groups disestablished in 2006
Musical quartets
1993 establishments in Sweden